Horseshoe Lake is the name of four lakes in New Zealand.

Horseshoe Lake, Hawke's Bay
This is a very small lake approximately 14 km east of Waipawa in the Hawke's Bay region of the North Island of New Zealand.

Horseshoe Lake, Waikato
Also known as Waiwhakareke, this is a small lake in the western outskirts of Hamilton in the Waikato region of the North Island of New Zealand.

Horseshoe Lake, Hurunui
This is a small lake approximately 27 km south west of Hanmer Springs in the Hurunui District of the Canterbury region of the South Island of New Zealand.

Horseshoe Lake, Christchurch
This is a small urban lake in northeast Christchurch, close to the Avon River. The area within the curve of the lake is a nature reserve.

Lakes of Canterbury, New Zealand
Lakes of the Hawke's Bay Region
Lakes of Waikato